The Scuttlers is a lost 1920 American silent drama film produced and distributed by the Fox Film Corporation and directed by J. Gordon Edwards. William Farnum and Jackie Saunders star in this adventure.

Cast

William Farnum as Jim Landers
Jackie Saunders as Laura Machen
Herschel Mayall as Captain Machen
G. Raymond Nye as Erickson
Arthur Millett as Linda Quist
Harry Spingler as George Pitts 
Manuel R. Ojeda as Raymond Caldara
Earl Crain as Don Enrico Ruiz (credited as Erle Crane)
Kewpie Morgan as The Cook
Claire de Lorez as Senorita Juanita Bonneller
Al Fremont as Rosen

See also
1937 Fox vault fire

References

External links

1920 films
American silent feature films
Films directed by J. Gordon Edwards
Films based on American novels
Lost American films
Silent American drama films
1920 drama films
Fox Film films
American black-and-white films
1920 lost films
Lost drama films
1920s American films